Sławomir Łosowski (born 31 August 1951 in Gdańsk) is a synthesizer player from Poland. He is known as the leader and founder of the synthpop band Kombi. His son Tomasz also plays with the band.

References

External links
 Artist's homepage
 Official Kombi homepage

1951 births
Living people
Polish keyboardists